Steam cleaning involves using steam for cleaning. Its uses include domestic applications in cleaning flooring and household dirt removal, and industrial uses in removing grease and dirt from engines.

Use 
Steam cleaning is not suited for all materials, such as materials which are vapor-sensitive or sensitive for high temperatures. Some examples include silk, some types of plastic, leather, paper, wallpaper and water-based paint.

Environmental friendliness 
When used without soap, detergents, or other cleaning products, steam cleaning is an eco-friendly way of cleaning.

Bacteria 
Steam cleaning is effective in eliminating 99.9% of bacteria, and is considered a modern way to clean home air-conditioners.

Use in self-cleaning ovens 
In ovens, steam cleaning is an alternative to catalysis and pyrolysis for making a self-cleaning oven, and uses a lower temperature (approximately 100 celsius) compared to catalysis (approx. 200 celsius) and pyrolysis (approx. 500 celsius).

See also
 Carpet cleaning – using "hot water extraction"
 Clothes steamer
 Steam mop
 Vapor steam cleaning

References

Cleaning methods
Steam power

tr:Buharlı temizlik